Bernabé de Castro, O.S.A. (1644–1707) was a Roman Catholic prelate who served as Archbishop of Brindisi (1700–1707) and Archbishop of Lanciano (1697–1700).

Biography
Bernabé de Castro was born in Manrique, Italy on 15 June 1644 and ordained a priest in the Order of Saint Augustine.

On 25 February 1697, he was appointed Archbishop of Lanciano by Pope Innocent XII. On 3 March 1697, he was consecrated bishop by Pier Matteo Petrucci, Cardinal-Priest of San Marcello, with Carlo Loffredo, Archbishop of Bari-Canosa, and François Marie Sacco, Bishop of Ajaccio, serving as co-consecrators. 

On 15 December 1700, he was appointed Archbishop of Brindisi by Pope Clement XI.
He served as Archbishop of Brindisi until his death on 11 December 1707.

Episcopal succession
While bishop, he was the principal co-consecrator of:
Tommaso Antonio Scotti, Archbishop of Dubrovnik (1701); and 
Francesco Frosini, Bishop of Pistoia e Prato (1701).

References

External links
 (for Chronology of Bishops) 
 (for Chronology of Bishops) 

17th-century Roman Catholic archbishops in the Kingdom of Naples
18th-century Roman Catholic archbishops in the Kingdom of Naples
Bishops appointed by Pope Innocent XII
Bishops appointed by Pope Clement XI
1644 births
1707 deaths
Augustinian bishops